Danny Meagher or Daniel Meagher may refer to:

 Danny Meagher (bishop) (born 1961), auxiliary bishop of the Roman Catholic Archdiocese of Sydney
 Danny Meagher (basketball) (born 1962), Canadian basketball player